DeBell is a surname. Notable people with the surname include:

Jimmy DeBell (born 1962), American former football official
Kristine DeBell (born 1954), American actress

See also
Frederick Debell Bennett (1806-1859), English ship surgeon and biologist
Debel (disambiguation)
Debelle, surname